Dominic Bird (born 9 April 1991) is a New Zealand rugby union player who plays as a lock and has represented the All Blacks. He has also played for Canterbury and Wellington in the Mitre 10 Cup, the Crusaders and Chiefs in Super Rugby. He has also played for Racing 92 in the French Top 14.

Early life
Bird was educated at Central Hawkes Bay College. He debuted for the 1st XV in 2007 and went on to captain the side in 2008 in a historic victory over Hastings Boys High school alongside other key players the likes of Bredon Edmonds (NZ Maori), Mua Sala (Spain), Karawa Russell (Waipawa Country United Mens), Jack Richardson (Ruatoria CITY), Andrew Burnt (Wakeley Sheild). Born in Hawke's Bay, Bird moved to Christchurch where he attended Lincoln University on a Rugby Scholarship.

Career
Bird was a member of the New Zealand Under 20 team which won the 2011 IRB Junior World Championship in Italy.

Bird was a member of the  Wider Training Group in 2012 and was selected as a senior squad member for the 2013 Super Rugby season. Bird was selected for the 2013 All Blacks wider training squad of 38 to train for the June test series against France and went on to make his international debut against Japan in November, starting for them in the 54–6 win before being replaced by Sam Whitelock. Bird broke the record for tallest All Black in history on his debut, standing 1 cm taller than previous record holder, the now-retired Mark Cooksley. Bird made another appearance for the All Blacks one year later, starting against Scotland in a 24–16 win on the 2014 end-of-year tour after being called in as cover for Luke Romano.

Bird switched Super Rugby teams to the Chiefs for the 2016 Super Rugby season, forming a formidable locking partnership with All Blacks team-mate Brodie Retallick. Bird became a regular starter for the Chiefs, including against the touring British and Irish Lions team in 2017, with the Chiefs losing to the Lions 34–6. Bird also went on to start in the knockout rounds but the Chiefs were eliminated from the competition in the semi-final against Bird's former team the Crusaders who went on to win the competition. After a solid Mitre 10 Cup campaign, Bird was re-selected for the All Blacks for the 2017 end-of-year tour after three years' absence from international rugby. This came after Bird started against the All Blacks for the Barbarians in a 22–31 loss to the All Blacks. Bird started for the All Blacks against a French XV on 14 November and was not subbed off, with the All Blacks winning 28–23.

On 1 June 2018, Bird travelled to France to sign for Top 14 side Racing 92 ahead of the 2018–19 season.

References

External links

1991 births
New Zealand rugby union players
New Zealand international rugby union players
Canterbury rugby union players
Crusaders (rugby union) players
Chiefs (rugby union) players
Racing 92 players
Rugby union locks
People from Waipukurau
Living people
Barbarian F.C. players
Wellington rugby union players
Hurricanes (rugby union) players
Rugby union players from the Hawke's Bay Region